As the family Picrodendraceae is erected from the bases of subfamily Oldfieldioideae, its taxonomy remains the same:

Tribe Caletieae
There are 4 subtribes and 13 genera:

Subtribe Dissiliariinae
Austrobuxus (also Buraeavia, Bureaua, Canaca, Choriophyllum)
Choriceras
Dissiliaria
Longetia
Sankowskya
Whyanbeelia

Subtribe Hyaenanchinae
Hyaenanche (also Toxicodendrum)

Subtribe Petalostigmatinae
Petalostigma (also Xylococcus)

Subtribe Pseudanthinae
Kairothamnus
Micrantheum (also Allenia, Caletia)
Neoroepera
Pseudanthus (also Chorizotheca, Chrysostemon, Stachystemon)
Scagea

Tribe Picrodendreae
There are 3 subtribes and 8 genera:

Subtrible Mischodontinae
Androstachys
Aristogeitonia (also Paragelonium)
Mischodon
Stachyandra
Voatamalo

Subtribe Paiveusinae
Oldfieldia (also Cecchia, Paivaeusa)

Subtribe Picrodendrinae
Parodiodendron
Picrodendron
Piranhea (also Celaenodendron)

Tribe Podocalyceae
This tribe has 3 subtribes and 3 genera:

Subtribe Paradrypetinae
Paradrypetes - moved to Rhizophoraceae

Subtribe Tetracoccinae
Tetracoccus (also Halliophytum)

Subtribe Podocalycinae
Podocalyx

Incertae sedis
Tacarcuna

See also
Taxonomy of the Euphorbiaceae
Taxonomy of the Phyllanthaceae

References

.
.
Taxonomic lists (genera)
Lists of plant genera (alphabetic)